Truesports was an automobile racing team founded by Jim Trueman based in Hilliard, Ohio. The team is best known for winning the 1986 Indianapolis 500 and back-to-back CART championships in 1986 and 1987. The team won 19 points-paying Indy car races.

The word "Truesports" is a portmanteau of the surname "Trueman" and the word "sports" or perhaps the word "motorsports." The primary crew chief of the team was Steve Horne, who would later start Tasman Motorsports.

In 1993, the team was absorbed into what is now Rahal Letterman Racing.

Racing team

Early years
Jim Trueman himself started racing sports cars in 1962. In the 1970s, Trueman met up with Bobby Rahal, and they entered the Can-Am series. After several seasons in Can-Am, Trueman and Rahal began to look towards the CART series and the Indianapolis 500.

In 1981, Trueman sponsored the car of owner/driver Vern Schuppan in the Indianapolis 500 through his Red Roof Inn motel business. The car came home third. Starting in 1982, the Truesports CART team was founded with Bobby Rahal driving. Rahal won his first race midway through the season at Cleveland. He followed that up with another win at Michigan, a second-place finish in the season standings, and clinched the CART rookie of the year award.

In 1983 and 1984, Truesports continued to succeed with Rahal behind the wheel. They won three more races, and placed 7th at the 1984 Indianapolis 500.

In 1985, Truesports secured the sponsorship of Budweiser. Rahal qualified for the front row at Indy, but early in the race, mechanical problems ended their day. Later in the season, Rahal made a strong charge in the championship points standings. He had a stretch of three wins over a five race span, and placed third in the final points standings.

Concurrent with their primary CART effort, Truesports ventured into IMSA racing on several occasions in the mid-1980s. In 1982, Trueman and Rahal finished second at the 12 Hours of Sebring. The duo also teamed up to race in the 1982 24 Hours of Le Mans with Garretson Developments, who Rahal won the 1981 24 Hours of Daytona.

Championship seasons

Truesports racing entered 1986 with considerable anticipation. The highlight of the season was a victory at the 1986 Indianapolis 500. After a two-year battle with cancer, team owner Jim Trueman succumbed to the disease eleven days after the Indy 500 victory. The team dedicated their efforts to Trueman's memory, and Rahal went on to win six races, and the 1986 CART championship.

For 1987, Steve Horne and other members of the Trueman family had assumed day-to-day operations of the team. Truesports switched from March to the Lola chassis, and remained with the reliable Cosworth DFX powerplant. Several of the top team in CART (Penske, Patrick, and Newman/Haas) had moved to the more powerful Chevrolet-Ilmor. Despite this, Truesports continued to see success on the track.

Hoping to win back-to-back races at Indianapolis, Rahal qualified second. Having switched to the Lola, he enjoyed a comfortable month, while many competitors (particularly those in March and Penske chassis), were experiencing a tumultuous time getting their cars up to speed. Race day, however, ended early for Rahal due to an ignition problem. Rahal won three races during the season, and clinched his second consecutive CART title.

Also in 1987, Truesports won the ARS Championship with driver Didier Theys. ARS was the precursor to the modern day Indy Lights series.

Changes
For 1988, Truesports switched to the Judd engine. It was known to be underpowered but very reliable and competitive in the 500-mile races due to its high fuel economy. Rahal finished 4th at Indianapolis, second in the Michigan 500, and won the Pocono 500. The Pocono win, however, was the lone win of the season, and Rahal chose to leave the team at the end of the year.

In 1989, Truesports signed rookie Scott Pruett as driver. Pruett won co-Rookie of the Year at Indianapolis, and had one second-place finish (Detroit). He went into the Detroit race with a decided advantage. He was one of few drivers in the field familiar with the Detroit street circuit (previously a Formula One course), and had won the SCCA Trans-Am Motor City 100 (a support race for the Formula One event) in 1987.

In March 1990, Pruett was seriously injured in a preseason testing crash at West Palm Beach, Florida, an IMSA street course. Raul Boesel drove as a replacement for the entire season. His best finish was 6th place. Pruett spend the entire 1990 season on the sidelines in physical rehab.

Chassis program

In 1985, Trueman and Rahal traveled to Italy to meet with Ferrari and made a demonstration run for them with a March 85C-Cosworth. Later, Ferrari built their own Indy car chassis, the Ferrari 637, and Truesports seemed poised to become the first team to compete with it. The chassis partnership, however, never materialized, and was instead merely a bargaining tool by the Ferrari Formula One team.

Starting in 1990, Truesports began exploring an in-house chassis building program. The Truesports All-American chassis was set to debut for 1991 CART season. Unlike the in-house Penske and Galmer chassis of the time, which were assembled in England, the Truesports chassis notably was constructed entirely in the U.S. The fabrication work was based out of their Hilliard, Ohio shops. In addition, the design team utilized a rolling road wind tunnel at the Aeronautical and Astronautical Research Laboratory at nearby Ohio State University.

Don Halliday did the primary design for the program. In 1990, the team drove the entire season in year-old  Lola cars to save cost. When Pruett returned from injury in 1991, he drove the Truesports 91C-Judd machine to a respectable first season.

In 1992, the chassis was further developed, and was powered by the dominant Chevy Indy A engine. Pruett, however, still failed to win any races. Longtime sponsor Budweiser announced they were pulling out and switching to King Racing for 1993. Midway through the 1992 season, facing escalating costs, the team announced they were going to abandon the in-house chassis project. Steve Horne resigned in June.

Demise
Although it was not openly revealed at the time, the association with Ferrari (and subsequent cancellation of the chassis/engine program) in the late 1980s had an effect on the team. Though Rahal was defending champion of both the Indy 500 and the CART title, the team did not have the preferred Ilmor Chevy Indy V-8 engine for 1987 or 1988. The lack of a competitive engine was a key reason why Rahal left the team. Rahal's 1988 win at Pocono was the team's final triumph.

After a slumping 1992 season, the Truesports organization decided to reorganize its assets. The team's physical assets, headquarters, and chassis program was first leased, then eventually absorbed into the Rahal-Hogan Racing team, co-owned by former Truesports driver Bobby Rahal. The remainder of the Trueman family businesses operated separately.

In 1993, Rahal-Hogan Racing attempted to continue the Truesports chassis program. It was rebranded the R/H chassis, and quickly scored a second-place finish at Long Beach. The success was short-lived however, as the chassis proved uncompetitive on superspeedways. The team was dealt a massive blow when Rahal failed to qualify at Indianapolis a month later. The following week they switched to the more conventional Lola, while team driver Mike Groff attempted to salvage a season out of the R/H. By the end of the year, the chassis project was abandoned permanently.

CART Drivers

 Bobby Rahal (1982-1988)
 Scott Pruett (1989, 1991–1992)
 Raul Boesel (1990)
 Geoff Brabham (1991)

ARS Drivers
 Didier Theys
 Colin Trueman
 Steve Millen

Business ventures
Mid-Ohio Sports Car Course - bought by Jim Trueman in 1981 and owned by the Trueman family.
 The Mid-Ohio School - A comprehensive driving and riding school, focusing on high performance, defensive driving, fleet training and competition licensing, since 1993
Truesports Choice - A high performance automobile parts company
Truepower - engine development organization
Trueperformance - A high-line collision repair facility

Complete Racing Results

PPG CART Indycar World Series
(key)

IndyCar wins

External links
 Biography Truesports Team

References

 
American auto racing teams
American racecar constructors
Champ Car teams
Indy Lights teams